Jakub Jakubov (born 1 February 1989) is a Slovak-Czech football goalkeeper who currently plays for German club Chemnitzer FC.

He was named in Czech squad for the 2009 FIFA U-20 World Cup but did not take part in any matches at the tournament.

References

External links
 
Chemnitzer FC profile

1989 births
Living people
Slovak footballers
Association football goalkeepers
FK Dukla Prague players
SK Kladno players
FK Mladá Boleslav players
Regionalliga players
FSV Budissa Bautzen players
FC Viktoria 1889 Berlin players
3. Liga players
FC Silon Táborsko players
FC Spartak Trnava players
Berliner AK 07 players
Chemnitzer FC players
Slovak expatriate sportspeople in the Czech Republic
Slovak expatriate sportspeople in Germany
Expatriate footballers in the Czech Republic
Expatriate footballers in Germany
Sportspeople from Košice
Czech National Football League players